Rosebank Cemetery is a 19th-century cemetery in Edinburgh. It is located at the junction of Pilrig Street and Broughton Road in the Pilrig area, close to the historical boundary of Leith. The cemetery is protected as a category C listed building.

History
The cemetery was developed by the Edinburgh and Leith Cemetery Company, with David Cousin as architect, and opened on 20 September 1846. Originally known as the Edinburgh and Leith Cemetery, the cemetery proved popular and was extended eastwards around 1880.

The main entrance was originally from the north-west (Broughton Road) but this has been sealed. The sole entrance is now from the north-east (Pilrig Street). The latter originally had an entrance lodge above the gate, but this was demolished around 1975.

The cemetery was in independent private ownership until around 1980 when the City of Edinburgh Council then took over the grounds.

Memorials

A large memorial at the furthest point from the current Pilrig Street entrance, lying against Broughton Road wall near North Pilrig Heights, marks a mass grave and commemorates the Gretna rail disaster of 22 May 1915, in which 215 soldiers of the 1st/7th Battalion The Royal Scots were killed. The men, mostly from Leith, were on their way to board ship at Liverpool in order to travel to the battlefront at Gallipoli. The handful of survivors were sent onwards the following day. The bodies of those killed in the railway disaster were returned to Leith and buried with great aplomb on 24 May with the 15th and 16th battalions Royal Scots serving as guard of honour. These are among 270 First World War casualties and 36 Second World War casualties interred at Rosebank.

The cemetery also houses the main war memorial to the two world wars, serving the Pilrig area, marked by a white cross designed by Sir Edwin Lutyens. Over and above this memorial and the Gretna Memorial there are several war graves scattered through the cemetery for individuals who died of wounds or disease on return from the war.

A number of 19th-century merchants and ship-owners, shipbuilders and ship-masters from Leith are buried at Rosebank. There are also several 20th-century Sikh and Islamic burials. The apparently high number of "pilots" refers to harbour pilots (the original meaning) rather than aircraft pilots. Unusual surnames found include Arcus, Carnie, Combe, Cormack, Eunson, Flucker, Goalen, Junner, Kellock, Ketchen, Spaven, Tilloch and Waldie.

Those who are homeless and die on the street along with several stillborn children (Scots law requires burial not cremation) are buried at the cemetery. The latter are marked by a modern monument giving a place to remember them, in interlocking granite pieces representing mother and child. The inscription reads "to all those children never known but always loved".

An abnormally high number of stones are noted as "drowned" or "lost at sea" (see Notable Interments).

Notable interments

 Andrew Peebles Aitken (1843–1904) biochemist
 Thomas Aitken (1833–1912), Provost of Leith from 1887 to 1893 
 James Bertram (1816–1861), engineer
 Rev William Garden Blaikie, (1820–1899)
 Alan Brebner (died 1890), civil engineer and an associate of lighthouse designers David and Thomas Stevenson.
Shipowner Robert Cook (drowned in wreck of SS Roslin in 1888) bronze head by William Brodie
 George Craig (1852–1927) architect. His wife, Annie Blackie is the oldest person in the cemetery (105).
 Monument to the three illegitimate children of Sir George de la Poer Beresford
 Frederick Andrew Fitzpayne (1878–1935) creator of the Leith tram system (Scotland's first electric tram) and then in charge of the combined Edinburgh/Leith tram system
 A rare female war grave from World War I to E.G.Elder of the Women's Royal Naval Service d.7.7.1918, plus a female war grave from World War II to E.W.L.Fruish, also Women's Royal Navy Service
 M.P. Galloway (1843–1919), shipbuilder
 William Gilmour JP FRSE (1843–1905)
 James Douglas Allan Gray (1902–1993) pathologist
 Rev Prof James Harper (1795–1879)
 Dr John Henderson (1819–1901) Provost of Leith 1875 to 1881 and creator of the Leith Improvement Scheme and Henderson Street
 Lady Elizabeth Campbell Honyman (1784–1874)
 James Campbell Irons (1840–1910) legal author and geologist
 Andrew Leslie (1818–1894), shipbuilder
 Robert Lindsay, pharmacist, co-founder of Lindsay & Gilmour
 James Logan Mack (d.1939) author
 Charles Mackinlay (1809–1867) whisky blender
 George Melrose (d.1896) founder of Melrose-Drover
 Sydney Mitchell (1856–1930), architect and his father Sir Arthur Mitchell (1826–1909)
 James Campbell Noble RSA (1846–1913), artist
 William Notman (1809–1893) architect
 Thomas Peddie (1844–1911), railway and civil engineer
 Francis George Pentland (1866–1910) actor better known under the stage name of Frank Worthing (memorial only)
 George Ogilvy Reid (1851–1928), artist
 Ornate monument to Thomas Reid, nurseryman (1805–1848) by Hector Heatly Orrock (1831–1862)
 Prof Edmund Ronalds (1819–1889) chemist
 Lauchlan Rose (1829–1885) founder of Rose's lime juice
 Christian Salvesen (1827–1911), Norwegian merchant who settled at Leith and founded the company which now bears his name, also his older brother, Carl Emil Salvesen (1816–1877) opposite
James Simpson (Scottish architect) (1832–1894) creator of the Leith Improvement Scheme in 1888
 James Slight (1785–1854), assistant engineer to Robert Stevenson in the building of the Bell Rock Lighthouse and other lighthouse projects and his brother, Alexander Slight (1818–1885) also an engineer
 Henry Stephens (1794–1874), author of The Book of the Farm
 A pair of stones towards the southeast memorialise several members of the Stevenson family drowned in the Eyemouth disaster of 14 October 1881. One is noted as having been "interred 3 March 1882", his body having been washed ashore and identified five months later.
 Rev Dr David Thorburn DD (1805–1893) minister of South Leith Parish Church who defected at the Disruption of 1843
 Andrew Young (1807–1889), author of the hymn There Is a Happy Land

At the dead centre of the main=east-west path lie three conterminous graves of servants of Queen Victoria, each residsing at Holyrood Palace: Ida Bonanomi (1818–1854) Queen Victoria's dresser; Owen Gough (1800–1872); and Charles Watty (1814–1889) the Queen's servant for 42 years. The three stones and lairs were paid for by the Queen.

References

External links
 Rosebank Cemetery, Royal Commission on the Ancient and Historical Monuments of Scotland
 Inscriptions of Tombstones in Rosebank Cemetery

Cemeteries in Edinburgh
Category C listed buildings in Edinburgh
1846 establishments in Scotland
Commonwealth War Graves Commission cemeteries in Scotland